Bienaimé may refer to

Carole Bienaimé (born 1973), French television producer
Didier Bienaimé (1961–2004), French actor 
Émile Bienaimé (1802–1869), French composer
Luigi Bienaimé (1795–1878), sculptor working in Italy
Robert Bienaimé (1876–1960), French perfumer

See also
Bien-Aimé (disambiguation)
Irénée-Jules Bienaymé (1796–1878), French statistician